The 2007 Pacific Curling Championships were held from November 19 to 24 at the C.S.O. Curling Club in Huairou, Beijing, China.  The top 2 teams in each gender qualified for the 2007 World Curling Championships.

Men's

Teams

Round-robin standings

Round-robin results

Draw 1
Monday, November 19, 15:00

Draw 2
Tuesday, November 20, 9:00

Draw 3
Tuesday, November 20, 15:00

Draw 4
Wednesday, November 21, 15:00

Draw 5
Thursday, November 22, 9:00

Playoffs
There were 2 semi-final games in each match up.

Semifinals

Game 1
Friday, November 23, 9:00

Game 2
Friday, November 23, 14:30

Fifth-place game
Saturday, November 24, 14:30

Bronze-medal game
Saturday, November 24, 14:30

Gold-medal game
Saturday, November 24, 14:30

Women's

Teams

Round-robin standings

Round-robin results

Draw 1
Monday, November 19, 9:00

Draw 2
Monday, November 19, 15:00

Draw 3
Tuesday, November 20, 9:00

Draw 4
Tuesday, November 20, 15:00

Draw 5
Wednesday, November 21, 9:00

Draw 6
Wednesday, November 21, 15:00

Draw 7
Thursday, November 22, 9:00

Draw 8
Thursday, November 22, 15:00

Draw 9
Friday, November 23, 9:00

Draw 10
Friday, November 23, 14:30

Playoffs
As China was the first placed team at the conclusion of the round robin, a silver medal game was played to determine which team would go to the 2008 Ford World Women's Curling Championship.

Silver Medal Game
Saturday, November 24, 14:30

External links

Pacific Championships
Pacific Curling Championships
Pacific-Asia Curling Championships
International curling competitions hosted by China